Christian Klees (born 24 June 1968 in Eutin) is a German former sport shooter, the first shooter since the 1989 target change to have achieved the maximum score (600) in the 50 metre rifle prone event at the Olympic Games, which was later replicated by Sergei Martynov at the 2012 Summer Olympics. He did this in at the 1996 Summer Olympics in Atlanta, Georgia. His excellent final of 104.8 (out of maximal 109.0) also gave him the gold medal, as well as an aggregate result that was eventually surpassed by Martynov during the 2012 Summer Olympics, 16 years after his victory in Atlanta. Klees left the international shooting scene after the 2001 season.

References

1968 births
Living people
German male sport shooters
Olympic shooters of Germany
Shooters at the 1996 Summer Olympics
Olympic gold medalists for Germany
ISSF rifle shooters
World record holders in shooting
People from Eutin
Olympic medalists in shooting
Medalists at the 1996 Summer Olympics
Sportspeople from Schleswig-Holstein